Jill Mulvay Derr (born September 8, 1948) was a senior research historian in the Church History Department of the Church of Jesus Christ of Latter-day Saints (LDS Church) from 2005 to 2011. She previously served as Managing Director of the Joseph Fielding Smith Institute for Latter-day Saint History at Brigham Young University (2003-2005), where she was also Associate Professor of Church History (1998-2005). Her research and publications have focused on the history of Mormon and Utah women, and she is past president of the Mormon History Association (1998-1999).

Derr was raised as Jill Carol Mulvay in Salt Lake City.  Some of her publications have been credited under her maiden name.

Derr is a member of the LDS Church. Derr is married to C. Brooklyn Derr, and they are the parents of four children. Longtime residents of Alpine, Utah, they have also lived in Fontainebleau, France, and Tolochenaz, Switzerland.

Jill Mulvay Derr holds a bachelor's degree from the University of Utah and an MA in teaching from Harvard University.

Writings 

Derr edited Women's Voices: An Untold History of the Latter-day Saints, 1830-1900 with Kenneth W. Godfrey and Audrey M. Godfrey (Salt Lake City: Deseret Book, 1982; 2000).  She also co-wrote Women of Covenant: The Story of Relief Society (Salt Lake City: Deseret Book, 1992; 2000).  Her articles have appeared in BYU Studies, Journal of Mormon History, Utah Historical Quarterly, and Dialogue: A Journal of Mormon Thought   Her paper on Sarah M. Kimball received first prize in the 1976 Utah Bicentennial Biographies contest.

In 2016, the Church Historian's Press released the book The First Fifty Years of Relief Society: Key Documents in Latter-day Saint Women's History, which was edited by Derr, Matthew Grow, Carol Cornwall Madsen and Kate Holbrook.

The following is a partial list of Derr's published work:
.  Published as a pamphlet by Signature Books in 1981.

Books 

Davidson, Karen Lynn; Derr, Jill Mulvay (2012). The Life and Faith of Eliza R. Snow. Salt Lake City: Deseret Book. .

Notes

Sources
Open Library listing
Derr's vita

External links 
 
 

1948 births
American expatriates in France
American Latter Day Saint writers
Brigham Young University faculty
Harvard Graduate School of Education alumni
Historians of the Latter Day Saint movement
Living people
University of Utah alumni
Writers from Salt Lake City
Women historians
Latter Day Saints from Massachusetts
Latter Day Saints from Utah
Mormon studies scholars